Ellenhall is a civil parish in the Borough of Stafford, Staffordshire, England.  It contains five listed buildings that are recorded in the National Heritage List for England. Of these, two are at Grade II*, the middle of the three grades, and the others are at Grade II, the lowest grade. The parish contains the villages of Ellenhall and Ranton and the surrounding countryside.  The listed buildings consist of a church, a cross in the churchyard, the surviving tower of an abbey church, a house, and a milepost.


Key

Buildings

References

Citations

Sources

Lists of listed buildings in Staffordshire